University of National Education (abbreviated as Undiknas), is a private university in Denpasar, Bali, Indonesia. This university was established by I Gusti Ngurah Gorda and Ketut Sambereg. It was previously known as Akademi Keuangan dan Perbankan (AKABA) and was established on 17 February 1969 by Yayasan Pendidikan Kejuruan Nasional (YPKN).

References

External links
 Official website

Denpasar
Universities in Bali
Educational institutions established in 1969
Private universities and colleges in Indonesia